Nicola Frances LeFanu (born 28 April 1947) is a British composer, academic, lecturer and director.

Life
Nicola LeFanu was born in Wickham Bishops, Essex, England, to William LeFanu and Elizabeth Maconchy (also a composer, later Dame Elizabeth Maconchy). She studied at St Hilda's College, Oxford, before taking up a Harkness Fellowship at Harvard. In 1972 she won the Mendelssohn Scholarship. She later became Director of Music at St Paul's Girls' School (1975–77), taught at King's College London (1977–1995, as Lecturer, Senior Lecturer and Professor), and was then a Professor of Music at the University of York, where she was Head of Department from 1994 to 2001. She retired from teaching in 2008.

In 1979 she married the composer David Lumsdaine.

She earned a Doctorate in Music from the University of London in 1988 and holds honorary doctorates from the Universities of Durham and Aberdeen and from the Open University. She is active in many aspects of the musical profession, as composer, teacher and director.

Works
LeFanu has written around sixty works, including music for orchestra, chamber groups and voices (including four string quartets), and six operas. These have been widely played and broadcast, and many are available on CD. Her music is published by Chester Novello and Edition Peters.

Her operas are:
 Dawnpath, a chamber opera (1977),
 The Story of Mary O'Neill, a radio opera (1986)
 The Green Children, a children's opera to a libretto by Kevin Crossley-Holland (1990), based on the Green children of Woolpit
 Blood Wedding (1992, libretto by Debra Levy after Federico García Lorca)
 The Wildman, another collaboration with Crossley-Holland, commissioned by the Aldeburgh Foundation and first performed in June 1995
 Light Passing (libretto by John Edmonds, BBC/NCEM, York, 2004), which played to sellout audiences and received critical acclaim

Orchestral pieces include:
 The Hidden Landscape (1973)
 Columbia Falls (1975)
 Threnody (2015)
 The Crimson Bird (2016) (Text from the poem Siege by John Fuller)

Some of her other works:
 Echo and Narcissus for two pianos
 Concertino for chamber orchestra
 Catena for eleven solo strings (2001)
 Amores for solo horn and string orchestra (2003)
 Piano Trio (2003)
 Songs without Words for clarinet and string trio (2005), dedicated to Ian Mitchell and the Ensemble Gemini.
 Songs for Jane for soprano and viola (2005), "written for my cousin Jane Darwin" and dedicated "for Carola to sing to Jane"
 String Quartet No 4, premiered by the Bingham String Quartet in York, 2 September 2016.

References

External links
Nicola LeFanu's web page at ChesterNovello
Nicola LeFanu's web page at Peter's Edition

1947 births
Living people
20th-century classical composers
21st-century classical composers
British classical composers
British women classical composers
Academics of King's College London
Academics of the University of York
Alumni of St Hilda's College, Oxford
Harkness Fellows
Harvard University people
Nicola
People educated at St Paul's Girls' School
People educated at St Mary's School, Calne
20th-century British composers
21st-century British composers
20th-century women composers
21st-century women composers